Centro Deportivo Wanda Alcalá de Henares, is the new training ground and youth academy base of the Spanish football club, Atlético Madrid. Occupying an area of 70,000 m² in the town Alcalá de Henares ath the northeast of Madrid, it was officially opened on September 24, 2019.

Facilities
In addition to the service centre, the complex is home to:
Main Stadium of natural grass, with a capacity of 2,700 seats.
4 regular size pitches with artificial turf.
1 regular size pitch with natural grass (under construction).
1 seven-a-side artificial turf training pitch.
Multipurpose indoor sports hall.

References

Atlético Madrid
Association football training grounds in Spain
Sports venues in the Community of Madrid
Sports venues completed in 2019
Buildings and structures in Alcalá de Henares